Four Letter Words (also known as Climax) is a 2000 American comedy film by director Sean Baker, in his directorial debut.

Plot
A study of the post-adolescent male psyche, the film gives an often humorous but raw unadulterated look at the views, attitudes, and language of young men in Suburban America.

Critical reception
DVD Talk said "Although Baker shows a pretty good ear for dialog and a willingness to keep things lively in the editing room, and despite the best efforts of a quality cast, the movie never quite inspires. A bunch of guys standing around a garage talking about porn stars or bong hits may feel important to the filmmaker and might find a cult audience but the filmmaker would be better served finding a more original outlet for his storytelling talents. Still, fans of ultra-indie films might want to give this one a shot. It's got some good qualities and some nice performances."

References

External links

2000 films
American comedy films
American independent films
2000 comedy films
2000 independent films
2000 directorial debut films
Films directed by Sean Baker
2000s English-language films
2000s American films